Franz Burkard may refer to:

 Franz Burkard (d. 1539), Canon lawyer
 Franz Burkard (d. 1584), Canon lawyer